The Panther Mountain Formation is a geologic formation in New York. It preserves fossils dating back to the Devonian period. It is located in the counties of Albany, Madison, Oneida, Otsego, and Schoharie. It is well known for its fossil arthropods preserved as flattened cuticles, including Attercopus and Dracochela.

See also 
 List of fossiliferous stratigraphic units in New York

References 

Devonian geology of New York (state)
Devonian System of North America
Givetian Stage
Devonian southern paleotemperate deposits